Ypthima yatta, the Yatta ringlet or Yatta three-ring, is a butterfly in the family Nymphalidae. It is found in south-central Ethiopia and Kenya.

References

yatta
Butterflies described in 1982